Ronald Leon "Magic" Ward (born September 12, 1944) was a National Hockey League player from 1970-1972 who played center for the Toronto Maple Leafs and Vancouver Canucks. He then switched to the fledgling World Hockey Association, playing for the New York Raiders in the 1972–73 season. This would be his most productive season, as he amassed 51 goals and 67 assists for 118 points. Throughout the rest of his WHA career he went on to play for the Vancouver Blazers,  Los Angeles Sharks, Cleveland Crusaders, Calgary Cowboys, Minnesota Fighting Saints, and ending with the Winnipeg Jets in 1976–77.

Career statistics

Regular season and playoffs

References

External links

1944 births
Living people
Calgary Cowboys players
Canadian ice hockey coaches
Canadian ice hockey defencemen
Cleveland Crusaders players
Drummondville Voltigeurs coaches
Ice hockey people from Ontario
Los Angeles Sharks players
Minnesota Fighting Saints players
New York Raiders players
Phoenix Roadrunners (WHL) players
Rochester Americans players
Sportspeople from Cornwall, Ontario
Toronto Maple Leafs players
Tulsa Oilers (1964–1984) players
Vancouver Blazers players
Vancouver Canucks players
Winnipeg Jets (WHA) players